Bala may refer to:

Places

India
Bala, India, a village in Allahabad, India
 Bala, Ahor, a village in the Jalore district of Rajasthan
 Bala, Raebareli, a village in Uttar Pradesh, India

Romania
Bala, Mehedinți, a commune in Mehedinţi County
Băla, a commune in Mureș County

United States
Bala, Kansas, an incorporated community in Riley County, Kansas
Bala Cynwyd, Pennsylvania, a conglomerate of the suburbs Bala and Cynwyd, Philadelphia

United Kingdom
Bala, Gwynedd, a town in Wales
Bala Lake, the largest natural lake in Wales
Bala Series of geologic beds in Bala, Wales

Elsewhere
Bala, Ontario, a town in Canada
Bala Aerodrome, located adjacent to Bala, Ontario, Canada
Bala, Nepal, a Village Development Committee in Sankhuwasabha District in northeastern Nepal
Bal'a, Palestine, a town near Tulkarm in the West Bank
Bala, Russia, a rural locality (a selo) in the Sakha Republic, Russia
Bala, Senegal, a town in Tambacounda Region
Balâ, Ankara, a town and district of Ankara Province in Turkey

People
 Bala (name)

Religion
The Five Strengths, aka bala, the spiritual powers possessed by a Buddha or bodhisattva
Bala Tripurasundari, Hindu female goddess, represented as a small child
Bala Ganapati, an aspect of the Hindu god Ganesha

Films
Bala (1976 film), a documentary by Satyajit Ray about the Bharatanatyam dancer Balasaraswati
Bala (2002 film), an Indian Tamil film starring Shaam and Meera Jasmine
Bala (2019 film), an Indian Hindi film starring Ayushmann Khurana, Bhumi Pednekar and Yami Gautam

Other
Princess Bala, a character in the 1998 animated film Antz
Bala (band), a Galician stoner rock/grunge band
Bala, a comic book character from the Devi comic book by Virgin Comics
Bala language, Bantu language of the Democratic Republic of the Congo
Bala shark (Balantiocheilos melanopterus), a semi-aggressive minnow from Southeast Asia, somewhat common as an aquarium fish
Bala taxation, a system used in the Ur III dynasty of Mesopotamia
Bala, a common name for the flowering plant Country Mallow (Sida cordifolia), especially when used in Ayurvedic medicine

See also
Balla (disambiguation)
Bala station (disambiguation), stations of the name
Bala Hissar (disambiguation), places of the name